Cyclocheilichthys schoppeae is a species of cyprinid fish in the genus Cyclocheilichthys from the north of Palawan in the Philippines.

References

 

schoppeae
Fish described in 2007